Automotive Industry Standard 140, commonly known as AIS 140, is a set of standards formulated and published by Automotive Research Association of India (ARAI) as per the order issued by the Automotive Industry Standards Committee (AISC) of Ministry of Road Transport and Highways. These standards are formulated to build and maintain an intelligent transportation system in India.

Devices 
AIS 140 compliant device used Global Positioning System, Indian Regional Navigation Satellite System and GSM/General Packet Radio Service modem for vehicle tracking. In addition it can have a provison for hybrid navigation constellations such as GLONASS, and Galileo (satellite navigation).

In January 2019, Indian government directed all the state governments to enforce AIS 140 compliant GPS tracking devices with the supporting software for all passenger-carrying buses and other public transport vehicles.

List of ARAI-certified AIS-140 compliant device manufacturers 
iTriangle
Wheelseye
 KPIT Technologies
LetsTrack
LocoNav
ECOCOSMO
Relyeon
trax24
Blackbox

See also 
 Telematics
 Telematics 2.0
 Sydney Coordinated Adaptive Traffic System
 Freeway Traffic Management System

References 

Automotive standards
Vehicle telematics